The coat of arms of Novosibirsk is the official heraldic arms of the city of Novosibirsk in Novosibirsk oblast in Russia. The coat of arms of the city  were approved by the decision of the City Council of Novosibirsk from June 23, 2004 № 410 "On the emblem and flag of the city of Novosibirsk."

The arms is similar to the coat of arms of Novosibirsk Oblast and has basically the same symbols. The wavy bend sinister is for the River Ob, and the bridge for the Trans-Siberian Railway is also symbolically represented. The mural crown on top of the shield is the heraldic coronet of rank or symbol for a city. The supporters are black sables, and like the bow and arrows they come from the arms of Siberia.

The city flag is a simplified version of the proper coat of arms.

References

Novosibirsk
Novosibirsk
Novosibirsk
Culture in Novosibirsk